The 2009 Indian general election in Meghalaya, occurred for 2 seats in the state.

Constituency wise Results

References

Meghalaya
Indian general elections in Meghalaya
2000s in Meghalaya